Timotheos Tselepidis (born 2 February 1996) is a Greek professional footballer who plays as a centre back for Super League 2 club Apollon Smyrnis.

Career
On August 18, 2018 it was announced that Tselepidis had signed for Football League Panachaiki on a free transfer from PAOK.

References

External links

1996 births
Living people
Greek footballers
Greece youth international footballers
Super League Greece players
PAOK FC players
Panserraikos F.C. players
Footballers from Thessaloniki
Association football central defenders
Panachaiki F.C. players
Kalamata F.C. players
Apollon Smyrnis F.C. players